The Chicago Soul was a professional indoor soccer team that played in the Major Indoor Soccer League.  The Soul joined the MISL as an expansion team named the Chicago Kick in 2011, replacing the defunct Chicago Riot. As of September 2013, the club was no longer listed as a MISL team.

History
On September 27, 2011, the MISL announced that the Chicago Kick had failed to secure a suitable venue in time and would not play for the 2011–12 season. The Kick would try to join the league for the 2012–13 season.

On March 11, 2012, the team announced that they secured the Sears Centre as their home venue for the 2012–13 MISL season.

On June 22, 2012, the MISL awarded the Kick franchise to CEO/Owner  Dave Mokry.

On July 6, 2012, the team was renamed the Chicago Soul and Narciso “Chicho” Cuevas was hired as head coach.

On September 25, 2012, Cuevas resigned as head coach before the season started, citing family reasons. He was replaced by former Chicago Power player/coach Manny Rojas.

The Soul won their first MISL game on November 2, 2012, defeating the Syracuse Silver Knights 13–8.

On December 11, 2012, Manny Rojas was fired as head coach after a 2–7 start. He was replaced with Novi Marojević.

Year-by-year

Players

Current roster
''As of November 2, 2012 

Veteran Chicago Sting Play By Play Broadcaster Howard Balson was named to the same post with the Soul.
The Public Address Announcer for Soul Home Games at Sears Centre was Les Grobstein, who was replaced by Brett Myhres midway through the season.

References

External links
Team Website

2011 establishments in Illinois
2013 disestablishments in Illinois
Defunct indoor soccer clubs in the United States
Major Indoor Soccer League (2008–2014) teams
Soccer clubs in Chicago
Soccer clubs in Illinois
Association football clubs established in 2011
Association football clubs disestablished in 2013